"ABC" is a song by the Jackson 5. It was released as a single on February 24, 1970. The song knocked the Beatles' "Let It Be" off the top of the Billboard Hot 100 in 1970, and was No. 1 on the soul singles chart for four weeks. It is the title track to the group's second album.

"ABC" was performed on television on American Bandstand (February 21, 1970), The Ed Sullivan Show (May 10, 1970), and The Flip Wilson Show (November 4, 1971), among many other broadcasts. The upbeat lyrics compare learning to love to learning the alphabet. 

It was nominated for the Grammy Award for Best Pop Performance by a Duo or Group with Vocals in 1971. 50 Cent told NME that the song was the first he remembered hearing: "I've always loved MJ, so I guess it was probably a good place to start music: right here, with the ABCs." On November 7, 2016, the Grammy Hall of Fame announced its induction, along with that of another 24 songs.

Personnel
Musicians on the song's session were uncredited, per Motown policy. Motown did not list session musician credits on their releases until 1971. The musicians who performed on "ABC" are believed to be as follows.
 David T. Walker – guitar 
 Louis Shelton – guitar 
 Don Peake – guitar 
 Wilton Felder – bass guitar 
 Gene Pello – drums 
 Freddie Perren – keyboards 
 Sandra Crouch – tambourine 
 Unknown musician – bongos

Charts

Certifications

References

External links
 Overview of The Jackson 5 - "ABC" single. All the picture sleeves, song and remixes to listen at www.jackson5abc.com {non working link}
 [ The Jackson 5 - "ABC" song review by Bill Janovitz] at AllMusic
 The Jackson 5 - "ABC" (1970) song as listed on the Rock Band song library.
 LBJ and MLK
 Jon Batiste Sings Classic Valentine's Day Black History Month Love Songs

1970 singles
The Jackson 5 songs
Billboard Hot 100 number-one singles
Cashbox number-one singles
Songs written by Berry Gordy
Songs written by Freddie Perren
Songs written by Deke Richards
Motown singles
Songs written by Alphonzo Mizell
1969 songs
Songs about school
Songs about language
Grammy Hall of Fame Award recipients
Bubblegum pop songs